Ponentina is a genus of small air-breathing land snails, terrestrial pulmonate gastropod mollusks in the family Geomitridae.   the hairy snails and their allies.

Species
Species within this genus include: 
 Ponentina antoni (E. Gittenberger, 2012)
 Ponentina curtivaginata D. T. Holyoak & G. A. Holyoak, 2012
 Ponentina excentrica G. A. Holyoak & D. T. Holyoak, 2012
 Ponentina foiaensis G. A. Holyoak & D. T. Holyoak, 2012
 Ponentina grandiducta G. A. Holyoak & D. T. Holyoak, 2012
 Ponentina martigena (Férussac, 1832)
 Ponentina monoglandulosa D. T. Holyoak & G. A. Holyoak, 2012
 Ponentina octoglandulosa D. T. Holyoak & G. A. Holyoak, 2012
 Ponentina papillosa G. A. Holyoak & D. T. Holyoak, 2012
 Ponentina platylasia (da Silva e Castro, 1887)
 Ponentina ponentina (Morelet, 1845)
 Ponentina revelata (Michaud, 1831)
 Ponentina rosai (da Silva e Castro, 1887)
 Ponentina subvirescens (Bellamy, 1839), the type species
Taxon inquirendum
 Ponentina ponsonbyana (Pilsbry, 1895)

References

 AnimalBase info at: 
 Hesse, P. (1921). Beiträge zur näheren Kenntnis der Subfamilie Fruticicolinae. Archiv für Molluskenkunde, 53 (1/2): 55-83. Frankfurt am Main
 Bank, R. A. (2017). Classification of the Recent terrestrial Gastropoda of the World. Last update: July 16th, 2017.
 Holyoak, D. T.; Holyoak, G. A. (2012). A review of the genus Ponentina Hesse 1921 with descriptions of seven new species from Portugal and Spain (Gastropoda, Pulmonata: Hygromiidae). Journal of Conchology. 41(2), 173-238

External links
 E. Gittenberger, On two nominal Ponentina species (Helicidae, Hygromiinae); Basteria , Volume 42 - Issue 1/3 p. 14- 14

Geomitridae